The 2014 Gamba Osaka season was Gamba Osaka's 21st season in the J.League Division 1 and 27th overall in the Japanese top flight. It also included the 2014 J.League Cup and 2014 Emperor's Cup.   The season was one of unparalleled success as it saw them win the treble with an incredible comeback in the second half of the league season which saw them crowned J.League champions following a 0-0 draw away to Tokushima Vortis in December.   In addition they added both the J.League Cup and the Emperor's Cup to their trophy cabinet.   The feat was made all the more incredible by the fact that Gamba were only promoted back to J.League 1 at the beginning of 2014 following a one-season spell in the Japanese second division.

J.League 1 Results 2014

Final standings

Match Day Line-Ups

The following players appeared for Gamba Osaka during 2014 J.League 1:

  = Substitute on,  = Substitute Off,  = Number of goals scored,  = Yellow Card and  = Red Card.

J.League Cup results

Match day line-ups

  = Substitute on,  = Substitute Off,  = Number of goals scored,  = Yellow Card and  = Red Card.

Emperor's Cup results

Match day line-ups

  = Substitute on,  = Substitute Off,  = Number of goals scored,  = Yellow Card and  = Red Card.

Squad statistics

Statistics accurate as of end of 2014 season.

References

Gamba Osaka
Gamba Osaka seasons